Charlie Stallworth (born August 5, 1964) is an American politician who has served in the Connecticut House of Representatives from the 126th district since 2011.

References

External links

1964 births
Living people
21st-century American politicians
Democratic Party members of the Connecticut House of Representatives
People from Monroeville, Alabama
People from Bridgeport, Connecticut
Selma University alumni
Vanderbilt University alumni
African-American state legislators in Connecticut